Élie Aboud (born 12 October 1959 in Beirut, Lebanon) is a French-Lebanese politician and doctor. As a member of the National Assembly of France, he represents the 6th circonscription of the Hérault department, and is a member of the Les Republicains party. Aboud took up the position after the death of the previous deputy, Paul-Henri Cugnenc on 6 July 2007. He is a member of the Cultural, Family and Social Affairs Committee.

He was elected in 1995 as a City Councillor and served in this post until 2001, when he became eighth Deputy Mayor of Béziers.

He is chairman of "Generation France" Béziers, founded by Jean-François Copé, and is the Chairman of parliamentary research groups on repatriates and viticulture.

References

External links
  Élie Aboud - official website.
  Élie Aboud on the National Assembly website.

1959 births
Living people
Politicians from Beirut
French Maronites
Lebanese emigrants to France
Rally for the Republic politicians
Union for a Popular Movement politicians
The Popular Right
Deputies of the 14th National Assembly of the French Fifth Republic